Port of Makassar, also known as Port of Soekarno-Hatta, is a seaport in Makassar, Indonesia. It has the highest passenger traffic among Indonesian ports and the largest cargo traffic in Sulawesi. It is considered a primary port (Pelabuhan Kelas Utama) by the Indonesian Government, along with the Port of Tanjung Priok (Jakarta), Port of Tanjung Perak (Surabaya), and Port of Belawan (Medan).

Development
An expansion to the port, dubbed New Port Makassar, is under construction with an expected additional capacity of 1.5 million TEUs in its first phase. The Indonesian Ministry of Transportation has expressed a desire to designate the port as hub for the rest of Eastern Indonesia, in accordance to the Joko Widodo government's maritime axis program.

As of 2021, Makassar New Port construction has entered stages 1B and 1C with investments of Rp2.8 trillion, after stage 1A was finished and had been operating since early November 2018. Until the start of 2021, the progress of Makassar New Port construction project has reached 63.75% in the last two years in 2019 and 2020. Makassar New Port construction is set to finish by the end of 2022.

References

M
Makassar